Johanna Goliszewski (born 9 May 1986) is a German badminton player who has worked as a sport soldier in the Bundeswehr. She became the member of the Germany national badminton team in 2003. Teamed-up with Carla Nelte in the women's doubles, she competed at the 2016 Summer Olympics held in Rio de Janeiro, Brazil.

Achievements

BWF Grand Prix 
The BWF Grand Prix had two levels, the Grand Prix and Grand Prix Gold. It was a series of badminton tournaments sanctioned by the Badminton World Federation (BWF) and played between 2007 and 2017.

Women's doubles

  BWF Grand Prix Gold tournament
  BWF Grand Prix tournament

BWF International Challenge/Series 
Women's doubles

Mixed doubles

  BWF International Challenge tournament
  BWF International Series tournament
  BWF Future Series tournament

References

External links 
 
 
 Homepage Johanna Goliszewski

1986 births
Living people
Sportspeople from Olsztyn
German people of Polish descent
German female badminton players
Badminton players at the 2016 Summer Olympics
Olympic badminton players of Germany
Badminton players at the 2019 European Games
European Games competitors for Germany